Hörgársveit is a municipality located in north-central Iceland, in Northeastern Region. Its seat is the village of Lónsbakki .

History 
The former municipality of Hörgárbyggð  was formed on 1 January 2001 by the union of the municipalities of Skriða  (Skriðuhreppur ), Öxnadalur  (Öxnadalshreppur ) and Glæsibær  (Glæsibæjarhreppur ). In 2010 Hörgárbyggð merged with the municipality of Arnarnes  (Arnarneshreppur  ) to form the current municipality of Hörgársveit.

Geography 
Located on the Eyjafjörður, to the north of Akureyri, Hörgársveit is made up of several villages, principally Þelamörk , Lónsbakki (115 inhabitants) and Hjalteyri (37 inhabitants), the seat of the former municipality of Arnarnes.

References

External links 
Official website 

Municipalities of Iceland
Northeastern Region (Iceland)